Nikita Borisovich Dzhigurda or Nikita Borysovych Dzhyhurda is a Ukrainian movie actor, singer, and cult media icon.

As an actor, Dzhigurda is known for his portrayals of historical figures, in particular for the roles of Yermak's lieutenant, cossack Ivan Koltso, in a 1996 TV miniseries Yermak by directors Uskov and Krasnopolsky, of prince Andrey Kurbsky, king Charles XII of Sweden and Ukrainian poet Ivan Franko.

He is also known for his flamboyant lifestyle and performances, usage of Russian profanities, and his comic appearances on internet videos.

Since 2008 his wife is figure skater Marina Anissina. His first wife was actress .

Since 2011, he has been collaborating a lot with the Moscow hip-hop producer - KOKA beats.

Filmography
 1987 — Wounded Stones (Раненые камни)
 1988 — The Dissident (Диссидент)
 1991 — Behind the Last Line (За последней чертой)
 1991 — Ivan Fyodorov   as Andrey Kurbsky
 1991 — Merry Christmas in Paris! (Счастливого рождества в Париже!)
 1993 — Screw (Винт)
 1993 — An Unwilling Superman, or Erotic Mutant
 1995 — Sign of the Scorpio (Под знаком Скорпиона)
 1995 — To Love In Russian Way (Любить по-русски)
 1996 — Yermak (Ермак)   as Ivan Koltso
 1996 — To Love In Russian Way 2 (Любить по-русски 2)
 1999 — To Love In Russian Way 3: Governor (Любить по-русски 3: Губернатор)
 1999 — A Subtle Thing (Тонкая штучка)
 2001 — A Prayer for Hetman Mazepa (Молитва о гетмане Мазепе)   as Charles XII of Sweden
 2002 — Looking Down (Смотрящий вниз)
 2005 —- Vladimir Central Prison (Владимирский централ)
 2007 —- Madness: Challenge and Fight (Безумие: Вызов и борьба)
 2007 —- When Gods Were Asleep (Когда Боги уснули)
 2007 — Judgement Day (Страшный суд) - as Ivan Franko
 2008 — Crucified (Распятые)
 2011 — Inspector Cooper (Инспектор Купер)

References

External links
 

1961 births
Living people
20th-century Ukrainian male singers
21st-century Ukrainian male singers
Actors from Kyiv
Musicians from Kyiv
Soviet male film actors
Soviet male voice actors
Ukrainian male film actors
Ukrainian male voice actors
TikTokers